In Malaysia, the Menteri Besar (Jawi:منتري بسر; literally First Minister), colloquially referred to as MB, is the head of government of each of nine states in Malaysia with hereditary rulers. For four states without a monarch, the title Chief Minister (Ketua Menteri; colloquially referred to as KM in Malay or CM in English), is used except for Sarawak where it uses Premier (Premier). The title "Menteri Besar" is usually untranslated in the English media in Malaysia, but is typically translated as 'Chief Minister' by foreign media. According to protocol, all Menteris Besar, Chief Ministers and Premier are styled Yang Amat Berhormat (abbreviated YAB), which means "The Most Honourable".

The nine hereditary rulers of the Malay states and the appointed governors of the other four states serve as constitutional and ceremonial heads of their states, while the state executive authority rests with the Menteris Besar, Chief Ministers and Premier. Following elections to the state legislative assembly, the Ruler or Governor usually invites the party (or coalition) with a majority of seats to form the state government. The Ruler or Governor appoints and swears in the Menteri Besar, Chief Ministers and Premier, whose executive council (or Cabinet in Sabah and Sarawak) are collectively responsible to the assembly. Based on the Westminster system, given that he retains the confidence of the assembly, the terms of Menteris Besar, Chief Ministers and Premier can last for the length of the assembly's life—a maximum of five years. There are no limits to the number of terms that the Menteri Besar, Chief Minister and Premier can serve.

Background
In most states within Malaysia, the office was created by the British colonial government in 1948, in tandem with the creation of the Federation of Malaya. However, Johor was the first state to create the Menteri Besar position, subject to Undang-undang Tubuh Negeri Johor (Johor State Constitution) enforced by Sultan Abu Bakar. This had made Johor the first Malay state to adopt a system of constitutional monarchy. After Malaya gained independence from the United Kingdom in 1957, the office bearer is appointed among the state legislative assembly members by the Sultans. The Menteri Besar, Chief Minister and Premier usually come from the party (or coalition) which commands a majority in the state assembly.

Relations between the Menteris Besar, Chief Ministers, Premier and other levels of government
For many decades, the First Ministers (Menteri Besar), Chief Ministers (Ketua Menteri) and Premier (Premier) met with each other and the Prime Minister at Mesyuarat Menteri-Menteri Besar, Ketua-Ketua Menteri dan Premier.

Selection process

Eligibility
By comparison, the thirteen state constitutions (Undang-undang Tubuh Negeri or Perlembagaan Negeri) have some similarities and also some differences in setting the principle qualifications one must meet to be eligible to the office of the Menteri Besar, Chief Minister and Premier.

A Menteri Besar or Ketua Menteri or Premier must be a Malaysian citizen, of at least 21 years of age and a member of state legislative assembly who commands the confidence of the majority of the members of the assembly. Upon appointment, he shall not hold any office of profit and engage in any trade, business or profession that will cause conflict of interest.

For four states in Malaysia with governors (namely Penang, Malacca, Sabah and Sarawak), the office of Ketua Menteri and Premier are open to any Malaysian citizen regardless of their religion, ethnicity, and gender. However, citizens by naturalization or registration are still prohibited by state laws.

Election
The Menteri Besar, Chief Minister and Premier are elected through a majority in the state legislative assembly. This is procedurally established by the vote of confidence in the legislative assembly, as suggested by the Ruler (or Governor) of the state who is the appointing authority.

Oath
Since, according to the constitution, the Menteri Besar is appointed by the Ruler (or, in case of the Chief Minister and Premier, the Governor), the swearing-in is done before the Ruler (or Governor) of the state.

Remuneration 
Remuneration of the Menteri Besar, Chief Minister, Premier as well as other members of the Executive Council (or Cabinet) and members of the state legislative assembly are to be decided by the respective state legislatures. Hence this varies from state to state according to their ordinance or enactment that amended by the state legislative.

Present Menteris Besar, Chief Ministers and Premier

Timeline

See also
 Opposition (Malaysia)

References

Chief ministers of Malaysian states
Government of Malaysia
Politics of Malaysia
State political office-holders in Malaysia
20th-century Malaysian politicians
21st-century Malaysian politicians